Pityoborus is a genus of typical bark beetles in the family Curculionidae. There are about 12 described species in Pityoborus.

Species
These 12 species belong to the genus Pityoborus:

 Pityoborus comatus (Zimmermann, 1868)
 Pityoborus frontalis Wood, 1971
 Pityoborus hirtellus Wood, 1958a
 Pityoborus hondurensis Wood, 1971
 Pityoborus immitus Bright, 1972c
 Pityoborus intonsus Wood, 1958a
 Pityoborus ramosus Bright, 1972c
 Pityoborus rubentis Wood, 1958a
 Pityoborus secundus Blackman, 1928
 Pityoborus severus Bright, 1972c
 Pityoborus tertius Blackman, 1942a
 Pityoborus velutinus Wood, 1958a

References

Further reading

 
 
 

Scolytinae
Articles created by Qbugbot